Archibald Thomas Bartlett Wilcox (May 5, 1903 – August 27, 1993) was a Canadian ice hockey defenceman who played 7 seasons in the National Hockey League for the Montreal Maroons, Boston Bruins and St. Louis Eagles between 1929 and 1935. He also played several years in the minor leagues, primarily in the Canadian–American Hockey League, in a career that lasted from 1926 to 1935.

Both former NHL players, Archie Wilcox and Hazen McAndrew, who played for the Brooklyn Americans, died on the same day.

Career statistics

Regular season and playoffs

External links 
 

1903 births
1993 deaths
Boston Bruins players
Boston Cubs players
Canadian ice hockey defencemen
Ice hockey people from Montreal
Montreal Maroons players
Quebec Castors players
Providence Reds players
St. Louis Eagles players
Syracuse Stars (IHL) players